John David Roberts may refer to:

J. D. Roberts (1932–2021), American football coach
John Roberts (journalist) (born 1956), Canadian-American television journalist